Ring theory is a branch of algebra.

Ring theory can also refer to:

 Ring theory (psychology), a theory in psychology
 Chiastic structure, a literary technique